Mehath is a village in Madhubani District, Bihar State, India. It is a famous Village in Madhubani District. located 3.2 km from Jhanjharpur.  The village comes under Jhanjharpur assembly constituency.  Maithili is the local language here, according to the 2011 census, Maithili is the language spoken by 98.7% of the people here.

Demographics
The total population of the village is 4,923. The literacy rate is 84.00%. The female literacy rate is 79.00%. The male literacy rate is 87.00%.
The number of households in Balni Mehath is 1132; all the households are rural households. The working population is 64.00% of the total population. 69.00% of the men are working population; 58.00% of the women are working population.

Cast  brahmin 87%, Yadav 5%, other castes 8%

Mehath
has a humid subtropical climate with hot summers from late March to early June, the monsoon season from late June to late September and a mild winter from November to February. The highest temperature ever recorded is 46.6 °C, in 1996;, the lowest ever is 2.3 °C, in 2003. The highest rainfall was 204.5 mm, in 1997. The table below details historical monthly averages for climate variables.

Village - Balni Mehath,P.S - Bhairabsthan,
Block - Jhanjharpur, Dist. - Madhubani (Bihar)
Pin Code - 847404,

Education
Schools near by Balni Mehath
  Government Primary School MEHATH.NO.(2)
  Government Middle School MEHATH.
High school:- Dev narayan uchch vidyalaya. Bharam

'''Colleges near by Balni Mehath
 L. N. Janta College Jhanjharpur.
 Shivnandan Nandkishor mishra Mithila Mahavidyalaya Bhairavsthan.

Mukhiya Name - Jitendra Kumar Jha

Sarpanch Name - Gaurishankar (Rajhansh)

References

Villages in Madhubani district